Rainbow Over Texas is a 1946 American Western film in which Roy Rogers plays himself as a famous cowboy-singer returning to Texas. Directed by Frank McDonald from a story by Max Brand, it co-stars George "Gabby" Hayes and Dale Evans.

The self-portrayal of Roy Rogers as a more glamorous version of himself in Rainbow Over Texas revealed the great lengths to which Hollywood film studios would go in promoting their own film stars and made patently clear the self-referential advertising employed by studio productions in order to garner greater box office sales.

Since that time, "rainbow over Texas" has become a colloquialism for anyone who self-aggrandizes their own life in mythic and fantastical terms. For example, an individual who confabulates their previous experiences or resume out of either ignorance or self-importance is likened to a "rainbow over Texas".

The movie was shot on location near 426 W. Potrero Road in Thousand Oaks, California.

Cast
 Roy Rogers as Roy Rogers
 George "Gabby" Hayes as Gabby Whittaker
 Dale Evans as Jackie Dalrymple
 Sheldon Leonard as Kirby Haynes

References 

 
 Synopsis of the Film from Rotten Tomatoes

American English idioms
1946 films
Republic Pictures films
1946 Western (genre) films
American Western (genre) films
Films directed by Frank McDonald
1940s American films

Films set in Texas